National Prize may refer to:

Chile
Chilean National History Award, established 1974
National Prize for Journalism (Chile), established 1954
National Prize for Literature (Chile), established 1942
National Prize of Art of Chile, given 1944–1992
National Prize of Chile, established 1942
National Prize for Education Sciences (Chile), established 1979
National Prize for Humanities and Social Sciences (Chile), established 1992
National Prize for Medicine, established 2001

Spain
List of National Prizes (Ministry of Culture, Spain), awarded by Spain's Ministry of Culture
National Literature Prize for Narrative (Spain), established 1924
National Prize for Asturian Literature, Spain, established 2017
National Theater Prize, Spain
Premio Nacional de las Letras Españolas (National Prize for Spanish Literature), established 1984
National Music Prize (Catalonia)

Elsewhere
Magón National Prize for Culture, Costa Rica, established 1961
National Prize for Literature (Cuba), established 1983
German National Prize for Art and Science, Germany, given 1937–1939
National Prize of the German Democratic Republic, East Germany, given 1949–1989
Miguel Ángel Asturias National Prize in Literature, Guatemala, established 1988
Lithuanian National Prize for Culture and Arts, Lithuania, established 1989
National Prize for Arts and Sciences (Mexico), Mexico, established 1945
José Fuentes Mares National Prize for Literature, Mexico, established 1985
National Reunification Prize, an award of North Korea
Shevchenko National Prize, Ukraine, established 1961
Bobbitt National Prize for Poetry, United States, established 1990
National Prize for Literature (Venezuela), established 1948
National Prize of Plastic Arts of Venezuela,

See also
National Prize for Literature

Lists of awards